Tseyen-Oidovyn Tserennyam (born November 27, 1968) is a boxer from Mongolia, who competed in the flyweight (– 51 kg) division at the 1988 Summer Olympics, losing his opening bout to Kim Kwang-sun of South Korea. He won a bronze medal in the bantamweight category at the 1990 Asian Games in Beijing.

References

External links
 

1968 births
Living people
Flyweight boxers
Bantamweight boxers
Olympic boxers of Mongolia
Boxers at the 1988 Summer Olympics
Mongolian male boxers
Boxers at the 1990 Asian Games
Asian Games bronze medalists for Mongolia
Asian Games medalists in boxing
Medalists at the 1990 Asian Games
21st-century Mongolian people
20th-century Mongolian people